The Hinds Head, is a gastropub in Bray, Berkshire. The pub dates from the 15th century, and was converted into a restaurant in the 1920s. It was awarded a single Michelin star in the 2013 edition of the Michelin Guide and has retained it ever since. It has been owned by chef Heston Blumenthal since 2004.

Description
The Hinds Head dates from the 15th century, and the interior of the pub includes a panel commemorating the Vicar of Bray from the Tudor period who reportedly changed his political allegiance on three occasions due to the changes in the state religion of England. The interior retains elements of its earlier eras, including an open fireplace. The pub is owned by chef Heston Blumenthal, and is located nearby his three Michelin star restaurant, The Fat Duck.

Menu

The menu at the Hind's Head features Blumenthal's interpretations of dishes of British cuisine such as "Oxtail and Kidney Pudding" and "Tea-smoked Salmon with Sour Cream Butter and Soda Bread". Blumenthal's Triple Cooked Chips are also on the menu. Blumenthal had said that the development of the cooking methods for those chips was his first foray into a scientific approach to cooking. Former head chef Dominic Chapman worked with Blumenthal to develop a trifle for the dessert menu, which included multiple layers of syllabub, and both tea syrup and a green tea infusion. The menu includes both a set menu and a selection of a la carte dishes.

The pub has retained its bar, and has a range of bar snacks including scotch eggs made with quail eggs. While Blumenthal was researching historical dishes, several were tested out at the Hinds Head, including "quaking pudding" from the Tudor era, and chocolate wine from the 17th century. Beers served include those from the Greene King Brewery as well as guest beers from smaller breweries.

History

The precise original purpose of the building is not known, but it is thought that it was either a hunting lodge or an abbot's guesthouse. It was subsequently operated as a pub, until 1928 when it was purchased by Kitty Henry who combined it with the cottage next door and expanded the premises to operate the premises as a restaurant.

In 1947, Philip Mountbatten (later the Duke of Edinburgh) held his bachelor party at The Hind's Head prior to his marriage to Princess Elizabeth of the United Kingdom. Prince Philip returned in 1963 along with a party of fifty guests which also included Queen Elizabeth II, Prince Charles, the Princess Royal and King Olav V of Norway. Diana, Princess of Wales, would dine with her sons Princes William and Harry, after visiting them while they were staying at nearby Eton College.

It was sold by a brewery to chef Heston Blumenthal in 2004. Blumenthal purchased the pub with funds released from his previous investment in the Riverside Brasserie, also in Bray. He had bought the premises to use the car parking and offices for his nearby Fat Duck restaurant. He made the decision to serve British cuisine rather than the molecular gastronomy at his nearby restaurant.

In 2008, The Hind's Head made £51,088 profit overall for the year. Head chef Dominic Chapman left the Hind's Head to run The Royal Oak in Maidenhead, and was awarded a Michelin star at the new premises shortly afterwards. His replacement, Clive Dixon, also left the pub shortly afterwards to work at Koffman's restaurant at The Berkeley hotel in London. He was replaced by Kevin Love who had previously worked at the Hind's Head for eighteen months as the sous chef. By 2010, the profit made by the pub year on year had increased to £136,196. Following the announcement of his purchase of the nearby pub the Crown; Blumenthal admitted that the Hind's Head had become a destination for good food rather than a local tavern, and instead the Crown was acting as the village's local drinking establishment.

The pub entered itself in the 2012 Scotch Egg Challenge, as judged by Tom Parker Bowles, Gizzi Erskine and Eric Lanlard. The entry from the pub placed second; it was an Iberico pork sausage-meat covered quail's egg, coated in a breadcrumb mixture seasoned with salt infused with vinegar.

Reception
Michelle Rowe ate at The Hinds Head in 2007 for The Australian. She thought positively of the pub, describing the menu as "a happy collision of the sublime and the ridiculous". In particular, she thought that her oxtail and kidney pudding was "fabulous". Amol Rajan reviewed the pub for The Independent in 2010, and didn't like the lack of interior size or the atmosphere that resulted in. He thought that the lack of a suitable vegetarian option in the main courses was "appalling" but was pleased with the oxtail and kidney pudding. He also thought that the presentation of a venison cheeseburger on a small wooden board was "idiotic" and that the chocolate wine slush "evolve[d] from cocoa to bad claret with each mouthful". He gave the pub a score of six out of ten overall.

In 2007 it was named the fourth best pub in the UK for food in the PubChef awards. The Michelin Eating Out Guide named The Hinds Head as the best pub in the UK in 2011. It was awarded a single Michelin star in the 2013 UK and Ireland edition of the Michelin Guide, which was accidentally revealed by Michelin a week early due to a fault on their website. It was the fifth UK based star for Heston Blumenthal, and had previously been named a Bib Gourmand restaurant. It holds three AA Rosettes.

References

External links

 Official website

Restaurants in Berkshire
Michelin Guide starred restaurants in the United Kingdom
Gastropubs in England
Buildings and structures in the Royal Borough of Windsor and Maidenhead
Bray, Berkshire
15th-century establishments in England